Kentucky Route 125 (KY 125) is a  state highway in Fulton County. It runs from Tennessee State Route 5 (SR 5) at the Kentucky–Tennessee state line north of Woodland Mills, Tennessee, to KY 94 in Hickman.

Major intersections

References

0125
Transportation in Fulton County, Kentucky